{{Speciesbox
| image = Eremophilus-mutisii-Humboldt-Zoologie-T06p076.png
| image_caption = Eremophilus mutisii, original illustration by Humboldt
| status = LC
| status_system = IUCN3.1
| status_ref = 
| genus = Eremophilus
| parent_authority = Humboldt, 1805
| species = mutisii
| display_parents = 3
| authority = Humboldt, 1805
| synonyms = 
Of Eremophilus
Thrichomycterus Humboldt, 1805
Trachypoma Giebel, 1871
Of E. mutisii
Trachypoma marmoratum Giebel, 1871
Trichomycterus venulosus Steindachner, 1915 <ref>{{cite journal | last1 = DoNascimiento | first1 = C. | last2 = Saúl Prada-Pedreros | first2 = S. | last3 = Guerrero-Kommritz | first3 = J. | year = 2014 | title = Trichomycterus venulosus (Steindachner, 1915), a junior synonym of Eremophilus mutisii Humboldt, 1805 (Siluriformes: Trichomycteridae) and not an extinct species | journal = Neotropical Ichthyology | volume = 12 | issue = 4| pages = 707–715 | doi=10.1590/1982-0224-20130236}}</ref>
}}Eremophilus mutisii is a species of catfish (order Siluriformes) of the family Trichomycteridae, and the only member of its genus. This fish grows to about 30 centimetres (12 in) and originates from the Bogotá River basin, which is a tributary of the Magdalena River. It has probably been introduced to Ubaté, Chiquinquirá, and Tundama valleys, Colombia.E. mutisii uses the vascularized central portion of its stomach for aerial respiration. Air ventilation takes place during a rapid dash to the surface with the expiration of old air preceding inspiration. Air-breathing occurs in hypoxic and normoxic water, but is not obligatory. The evolution of a reduced swimbladder is associated with a benthic mode of life in E. mutisii''.

This fish species is an excellent food fish. It is the only species of food fish which has been able to survive competition from introduced trout and carp species into the region.

References

Trichomycteridae
Monotypic fish genera
Endemic fauna of Colombia
Freshwater fish of Colombia
Fish of the Andes
Bogotá River
Taxa named by Alexander von Humboldt